Nikola Stipanicev (born 9 December 1936) is a Croatian rower. He competed in the men's coxed four event at the 1960 Summer Olympics.

References

1936 births
Living people
Croatian male rowers
Olympic rowers of Yugoslavia
Rowers at the 1960 Summer Olympics